Iosif Szakács (also known as Iosif Szakács I; born 25 January 1934) is a Romanian former professional footballer and manager of Hungarian ethnicity. He grew up in Șimleu Silvaniei, then moved to Flamura Roșie Arad where he won the Romanian title in 1954. After Flamura Roșie, he moved to Dinamo Brașov, then to Dinamo București, where in 23 matches scored 7 goals. Szakács scored three goals in a 4–0 victory against CSM Baia Mare in the 1959 Cupa României final, helping Dinamo win the first Cupa României trophy in the club's history. In the last part of his career, Szakács I played for Crișana Oradea.

His brother, Ludovic Szakács (also known as Ludovic Szakács II) was also a footballer. Szakács brothers played together for Dinamo Brașov, Dinamo București and Crișana Oradea.

Honours
Flamura Roșie Arad
Divizia A: 1954
Cupa României: 1953

Dinamo București
Cupa României: 1959

Crișana Oradea
Divizia B: 1961–62

References

External links
 Iosif Szakács at labtof.ro

1934 births
Living people
People from Șimleu Silvaniei
Romanian footballers
Association football forwards
Liga I players
Liga II players
FC UTA Arad players
Unirea Tricolor București players
FC Dinamo București players
CA Oradea players